Greenland is an unincorporated community in Elysian Township, Le Sueur County, Minnesota, United States.

The community is located along 231st Avenue near its junction with Greenland Road.  Highway 60 (MN 60) is nearby.

Greenland had a post office from 1883 to 1914, and a station on the former Chicago Great Western Railroad.

Nearby places include Elysian and Madison Lake.

References

Unincorporated communities in Minnesota
Unincorporated communities in Le Sueur County, Minnesota
1883 establishments in Minnesota